Wolves and Thieves is the first studio album by Goldheart Assembly, released in 2010. The first single from the album was "King of Rome".

Track listing
 King of Rome (4:05)
 Anvil (3:20)
 Last Decade (5:02)
 Hope Hung High (3:31)
 So Long, St. Christopher (4:18)
 Engraver's Daughter (5:51)
 Jesus Wheel (4:54)
 Reminder (2:31)
 Under the Waterway (3:42)
 Interlude (0:52)
 Carnival 4 (The Carrying Song) (8:36)
 Boulevards (4:04)
 Oh Really (iTunes Bonus track)

References

External links
 

Goldheart Assembly albums
2010 debut albums